Valette Island is an island, 0.2 nautical miles (0.4 km) long, lying in the west side of the entrance to Mill Cove on the south side of Laurie Island, in the South Orkney Islands. Charted by the Scottish National Antarctic Expedition, 1902–1904, under Bruce, who named it for L.H. Valette, Argentine meteorologist at the Laurie Island station during 1904.

See also 
 List of antarctic and sub-antarctic islands
 

Islands of the South Orkney Islands